Canadian New Zealanders are New Zealand citizens who are of Canadian descent including immigrants or Canadian-born citizens and residents. Canadian New Zealanders constitute a small minority of New Zealand's population.

During the 19th century, many Canadians from Nova Scotia, New Brunswick and Prince Edward Island settled in New Zealand. The largest group settlement was at Waipu, where Scottish-born Reverend  Norman McLeod settled his congregation of Scottish and Nova Scotian emigrants during the 1850s.

Other Canadian settlements included Helensville, founded by John McLeod and named for his wife. And  Brunswick, founded by Tamberlane Campbell and named for his home province of New Brunswick.

Notable Canadian New Zealanders
  William Douglas Hall Baillie, 2nd Superintendent of Marlborough Province
 Brent Charleton, basketball player
 Joanne "Joe" Cotton, singer
 Daniel Gillies, actor
 Sarah Murphy, biathlete
 Tami Neilson, country & soul singer/songwriter
 Aaron Olson, basketball player
 Anna Paquin, actress
 Lynette Sadleir, synchronized swimmer
 Richard Tapper, freestyle swimmer

See also

 Caldoche
 Canadian Australians
 European New Zealanders
 Europeans in Oceania
 French New Zealanders
 Immigration to New Zealand
 New Zealand Canadians
 Pākehā

References

New Zealand
Ethnic groups in New Zealand